Modena City Ramblers (also known as M.C.R.) is an Italian folk rock band founded in 1991. Their music is heavily influenced by Celtic themes, and can be compared to folk rock music. The band has sold over 500,000 albums. Known for their left-wing politics, their lyrics often speak out against the Mafia and fascism.

Biography

The Modena City Ramblers were formed in 1991 by a group of friends who wanted to play traditional Irish music. The first to join were Alberto Morselli, Giovanni Rubbiani and Alberto Cottica (previously in Lontano da dove), Chris Dennis (formerly a member of Nomadi), Filippo Chieli, Franco D'Aniello and Luciano Gaetani from 'Abazia dei folli. On Saint Patrick's Day in 1991, during a concert in a pub in Modena, they chose the name Modena City Ramblers. The name was a homage to Dublin City Ramblers, an Irish band.

In 1992, they were joined by bassist Massimo Ghiacci (formerly in the band Plutonium 99). During the evening of 1 March, they recorded their first demo. During a concert at a pub in Carpi, Stefano "Cisco" Bellotti sang "The Wild Rover" for the first time. At this time the Modena City Ramblers became an open company, and have remained so during throughout their history, with almost all members who have left the band returning sporadically to play with the group. Their most famous concert was performed as the opening act for the Pogues in Modena. Their repertoire has since expanded considerably, including traditional Italian songs such as "Bella ciao", "Fischia il vento", and "Contessa".

The singer of the group Cisco along with producer Kaba Cavazzuti who also became "a new member of the Modena City Ramblers after changes in the original line-up", released the album of the ‘brother band’ Casa del Vento, titled "900" which came out in February 2001.

Members
The band's lineup has changed many times since their formation. After the first album, singer Alberto Morselli left the band; in 1996 Francesco Moneti replaced Marco Michelini, and Giovanni Rubbiani and Alberto Cottica left the band in 2001. Singer Stefano "Cisco" Bellotti left the band in 2005 after fourteen years. The lineup in 2006 was:

 Davide "Dudu" Morandi: singer, bass, acoustic and electric guitar, banjo, glockenspiel, harmonica
 Elisabetta "Betty" Vezzani: singer, acoustic and electric guitar, tambourine, mandolin
 Massimo "Ice" Ghiacci: acoustic and electric bass, double bass, tea chest bass, sax, backing vocals, acoustic guitar
 Franco D'Aniello: flute, tin whistle, trumpet, sax, backing vocals, acoustic guitar, glockenspiel, percussion
 Francesco "Fry" Moneti: acoustic and electric guitar, acoustic, electric and Indian violin, banjo, oud, mandolin, backing vocals
 Roberto Zeno: drums, percussion, backing vocals, mandolin, acoustic guitar and piano
 Arcangelo "Kaba" Cavazzuti: drums, percussion, acoustic guitar, bass, charango, piano, trumpet, shaker, banjo, backing vocals
 Luca "Gabibbo" Giacometti (died in 2007): bouzouki, mandolin, banjo, acoustic guitar, backing vocals

Discography

Album 
1994 – Riportando tutto a casa
1996 – La grande famiglia
1997 – Terra e libertà
1998 – Raccolti
1999 – Fuori campo
2002 – Radio Rebelde
2004 – ¡Viva la vida, muera la muerte!
2005 – Appunti partigiani
2006 – Dopo il lungo inverno
2008 – Bella ciao – Italian Combat Folk for the Masses
2009 – Onda libera
2011 – Sul tetto del mondo
2013 – Niente di nuovo sul fronte occidentale
2014 – Venti
2015 – Tracce Clandestine

EPs 
1998 – Cent'anni di solitudine
1999 – L'Italia ai tempi dei Modena City Ramblers
2003 – Modena City Remix
2003 – Gocce (for Acqua per la Pace)
2004 – El presidente

Rarities 
1992 – On the first day of march...Live demo – autoproduced demotape
1993 – Combat Folk – autoproduced demotape
2000 – Il resto raccolto – recorded only for fan club

DVD 
2004 – Clan Banlieue – twelve years of songs, concerts, interviews, journey, unreleased videos

Participations 
1995 – Tributo ad Augusto (CGD) – with L'atomica cinese
1995 – Materiale resistente – with Bella ciao
1995 – I disertori – a tribute to Ivano Fossati – play Gli amanti d'Irlanda
1999 – A come Ambiente (La Stampa)- with Madre Terra
2002 – Piazza Carlo Giuliani ragazzo – with La legge giusta (inspired by the 27th G8 summit)
2002 – Lontano – by Landscape Prayers
2003 – Balla veloce vivi lento – with Le lucertole del folk
2007 – Tre colori by Graziano Romani – with Spiriti Liberi; Stesso Viaggio Stessa Città; Corre Buon Sangue.
2007 – Nessuno oltraggi nessuno – with Socialdemocrazia by Gang, live version.

Collaborations 
 Several of the Ramblers' songs, such as "Cent'anni di solitudine", "Macondo Express", and "Remedios la Bella" are inspired by the 1967 novel One Hundred Years of Solitude (Spanish: Cien años de soledad) by Nobel Prize-winning Colombian author Gabriel García Márquez.
 The song "Il bicchiere dell'addio" features Irish singer Bob Geldof. The Ramblers later recorded a version of "The Great Song of Indifference" in Emiliano-Romagnolo language, inspired by Geldof's version 1990 hit from Vegetarians of Love album.
 The Ramblers' album Appunti Partigiani features collaborations with many artists, including Goran Bregović, Billy Bragg, Moni Ovadia, Piero Pelù, and Francesco Guccini.

References

External links
Official website
Official fan club

Italian folk music groups
Folk rock groups
Musical groups established in 1991
Musical groups from Emilia-Romagna
Folk punk groups
Celtic music groups
1991 establishments in Italy